Ludwig Schwarz may refer to:

Ludwig Schwarz (1822-1894), astronomer; see Peter Carl Ludwig Schwarz
Ludwig Schwarz (b. 1940), Catholic bishop